André Albert Morin is a Canadian politician, who was elected to the National Assembly of Quebec in the 2022 Quebec general election. He represents the riding of Acadie as a member of the Quebec Liberal Party.

A native of the Bordeaux-Cartierville neighbourhood in Montreal, he is a former deputy director of the Public Prosecution Service of Canada.

References

21st-century Canadian politicians
Quebec Liberal Party MNAs
Politicians from Montreal
French Quebecers
Living people
Year of birth missing (living people)